Brachycistidinae is a subfamily of the flower wasp family Tiphiidae that contains 10 genera and 85 species, and which is confined to the Nearctic zoogeographic region.

Distinguishing Characters
The wasps in the subfamily Brachycistidinae are distinguished from the subfamily Tiphiinae by having simple claws and the lack of an epicnemial suture, while the tegulae do not cover the axillary sclerites of the fore wings. These wasps demonstrate extreme sexual dimorphism; the females resemble ants and are wingless, while the males are winged and nocturnal. These extreme differences between the sexes have led to instances where the males and females are described as separate species, known as "dual taxonomy", and later work shows the two "species" to be synonymous. The identification of both sexes as a single species is often only achieved when they are collected in copula.

Biology
The female wasps of the family Tiphiidae are mainly ectoparasitic on fossorial beetle larvae, especially members of the family Scarabaeidae and carabid subfamily Cicindelinae, known as tiger beetles. The nocturnal, winged males are often attracted to lights, so are well represented in museum collections; the wingless females mainly live underground and are more difficult to collect, although they do emerge at night when they may also be attracted to lights. Few observations of the hosts of Brachycistidinae have been made, but a female of the genus Stilbopogon was observed stinging a beetle larva that was identified as belonging to a species of darkling beetle probably a species within the genus Eusattus.

Taxonomy
The taxonomy of the subfamily is difficult to resolve due to similarity of the structures of the species and their lack of distinctive colouration and patterning. However, the males show a number of distinguishing characters in the structures of their genitalia, heads, thoraces, and the venation of their wings.

Taxonomy according to Kimsey and Wasbauer (2006) 
The following genera are currently placed within the Brachycistidinae in two well-supported clades:

Clade one
Brachymaya Kimsey & Wasbauer 1999
Hadrocistis Wasbauer, 1968
Brachycistina Malloch, 1926

Clade two
Paraquemaya Kimsey & Wasbauer, 1999
Brachycistellus Baker, 1907
Dolichetropis Wasbauer, 1968
Sedomaya Kimsey & Wasbauer, 1999
Brachycistis Fox, 1893
Acanthetropis Wasbauer, 1958
Colocistis Krombein, 1942

Taxonomy according to Kimsey (2006) 
A phylogenetic analysis using females suggested a different phylogeny, but the true relationships of the genera in the subfamily will probably remain uncertain until a DNA based phylogenetic study can be undertaken.

The female-based phylogeny was:

Clade one 
Colocistis Krombein, 1942
Brachycistis Fox, 1893
Glyptacros Mickel & Krombein, 1942

Clade two 
Stilbopogon  Mickel & Krombein, 1942
Unnamed Genus A

References

Tiphiidae